Your Arms Too Short to Box with God: A Soaring Celebration in Song and Dance is a Broadway musical based on the Biblical Book of Matthew, with music and lyrics by Alex Bradford and a book by Vinnette Carroll, who also directed. Micki Grant was credited for "additional music and lyrics."

A 1980 revival was the Broadway debut of star Jennifer Holliday, then billed as Jennifer-Yvette Holliday.

Original production
Produced by Frankie Hewitt and the Shubert Organization, it opened December 22, 1976, at Broadway's Lyceum Theatre in New York City. It moved to the Eugene O'Neill Theatre on November 16, 1977, and closed January 1, 1978, after 429 performances.

Revival
Your Arms Too Short to Box with God was revived twice on Broadway, first at the Ambassador Theatre and the Belasco Theatre (June 2–October 12, 1980), then at the Alvin Theatre (September 9–November 7, 1982). During the 1982 run, Al Green appeared with Patti LaBelle in the show.

Legacy

The phrase first appeared in James Weldon Johnson's novel, "The Autobiography of an Ex-Colored Man," in which he attributed it to a Black preacher named John Brown. Describing this powerful preacher, he wrote, "He struck the attitude of a pugilist and thundered out: 'Young man, your arm's too short to box with God!'"

Later James Weldon Johnson used it in his poem "The Prodigal Son," which was published in his 1927 book of poems God's Trombones: Seven Negro Sermons in Verse. The passage — which likewise refers to an arm (singular) rather than arms (plural) — reads:

The title phrase has been used in other contexts. "Your lungs is too small to hotbox with God" is a line used by rapper Xzibit in Eminem's "Bitch Please 2". Xzibit later used a variation of the line ("Your little lungs is too weak to hotbox with God") on "Down for the Count" by Reflection Eternal. The phrase also appears in the Black Star song "Thieves in the Night", in the line "Your firearms are too short to box with God". GZA of the Wu-Tang Clan also used a variation ("Rhymes too short to box with God") on his track "Paper Plates" from Pro Tools. Killah Priest, an associate of Wu-Tang Clan, opened his debut album Heavy Mental with the phrase. It is in "It's All Real" by Pitch Black and "Mortal Combat" by Big Daddy Kane. Nas used the line in his song "You're Da Man" from his 2001 album Stillmatic. The line also appears in "Drunk Daddy" by the Cherry Poppin' Daddies, and in "F.I.F.A." by Pusha T. This line is also used in Dumbfoundead's song, "Korean Jesus" with the lyrics "Buddha blessed, with Muhammad, trying to hotbox with Gods."  Ralph Ellison uses the phrase in Invisible Man:  "Your arms are too short to box with me, son." Former professional wrestler CM Punk quoted the title word-for-word in a promotional clip on Monday Night Raw on January 7, 2013. In the 1990 album "Let the Rhythm Hit ’Em" by Eric B and Rakim, the line "Your arms too short to box with God so quit it" appears in the song "Untouchable".

Awards and nominations
Delores Hall won the 1977 Tony Award for Best Featured Actress in a Musical. Carroll earned Tony nominations for Best Book of a Musical and Best Direction of a Musical, with Talley Beatty nominated for Best Choreography.

References

External links

Your Arms Too Short to Box with God at BroadwayWorld.com. Retrieved on February 25, 2017.
Playbill for Your Arms Too Short to Box with God. Smithsonian Institution Transcription Center. Retrieved on February 25, 2017. Archived from the original on February 25, 2017.

1976 musicals
All-Black cast Broadway shows
Broadway musicals
Musicals based on the Gospels
Tony Award-winning musicals